The Michigan Mutual Liability Annex is an office building in downtown Detroit, Michigan, located at 25 West Elizabeth Street.

The high-rise was constructed in 1950 and finished in 1951. It stands at 13 floors in height, 10 above, and 3 below-ground. it is a part of the Michigan Mutual Liability Company Complex.

The Michigan Mutual Liability Annex is used mainly for offices, and includes a parking garage. The building was designed in the modern architectural style, and was built with brick and granite.

Description 
 Architect: Harley, Ellington, Day
 This building includes a 4-story parking garage at its base.
 Though rather plain in design and decoration, the building's ground floor is clad in granite.
 This building's first four floors are a 115-space parking garage that serve both the annex and the adjoining Grand Park Centre.
 The ground floor of this building is faced in granite, while the rest of the building is faced in simple brick.
 The main roof deck parapet rises to a height of 125'-4.25".
 The building is joined to the adjacent Grand Park Centre by a ramp in the lowest basement of the building, and by a skybridge that starts at the 4th floor lobby connecting all the way to the top at each floor of the building.

External links 
 Google Maps location of Michigan Mutual Liability Annex
 
 
 

Skyscraper office buildings in Detroit
Office buildings completed in 1951